Maytenus jefeana is a species of plant in the family Celastraceae. It is endemic to Panama.  It is threatened by habitat loss.

References

jefeana
Endemic flora of Panama
Trees of Panama
Endangered flora of North America
Taxonomy articles created by Polbot
Taxobox binomials not recognized by IUCN